Sulaibikhat Cemetery is the largest cemetery in Kuwait, where many dead have been buried since the sixties of the last century until now. The cemetery is divided into two parts, the Sunni cemetery, which opened in 1976, and the Ja'fari cemetery, which opened in 1973, so named for its presence in the Sulaibikhat area In the north-east of Kuwait, the Kuwaiti martyrs have a special section in the cemetery.

Notable interments
Abdullah Mubarak Al-Sabah
Jaber Al-Ahmad Al-Sabah
Sabah Al-Ahmad Al-Jaber Al-Sabah

References

External links
 

Cemeteries in Kuwait